The Allegheny Plateau  is a large dissected plateau area of the Appalachian Mountains in western and central New York, northern and western Pennsylvania, northern and western West Virginia, and eastern Ohio.  It is divided into the unglaciated Allegheny Plateau and the glaciated Allegheny Plateau.

The plateau extends southward into western West Virginia, eastern Kentucky, and Tennessee, where it is instead called the Cumberland Plateau.

The plateau terminates in the east at the Allegheny Mountains, which are the highest ridges just west of the Allegheny Front.  The Front extends from central Pennsylvania through Maryland and into eastern West Virginia.

The plateau is bordered on the west by glacial till plains in the north, generally north of the Ohio River, and the Bluegrass Region south of the Ohio River.

Elevations vary greatly. In the glaciated Allegheny Plateau, relief may only reach one hundred feet or less. In the unglaciated Allegheny Plateau in southeastern Ohio and westernmost West Virginia, relief is typically in the range of two hundred to four hundred feet.

Geology and physiography

The Allegheny Plateau is a physiographic section of the larger Appalachian Plateau province, which in turn is part of the larger Appalachian physiographic division.

See also
Allegheny Front, the transition escarpment from the Allegheny Plateau to the Ridge-and-Valley Appalachians
Ridge-and-Valley Appalachians

References

Bibliography

External links

 Photographs of the Allegheny Plateau and the Allegheny River watershed region

 
Appalachian Mountains
Appalachian Ohio
Geography of Appalachia
Northeastern United States
Physiographic sections
Physiographic regions of the United States
Plateaus of the United States